Gunnar Krantz may refer to:

Gunnar Krantz (artist), artist
Gunnar Krantz (sailor), sailor